The Protection of Plant Variety and Farmers Right Act, 2001 (PPVFR Act) is an Act of the Parliament of India that was enacted to provide for the establishment of an effective system for protection of plant varieties, the rights of farmers and plant breeders, and to encourage the development and cultivation of new varieties of plants. This act received the assent of the President of India on the 30 October 2001.

The PPV&FR Act, 2001 was enacted to grant intellectual property rights to plant breeders, researchers and farmers who have developed any new or extant plant varieties.  The Intellectual Property Right granted under PPV & FR Act, 2001 is a dual right – one is for the variety and the other is for the denomination assigned to it by the breeder. The rights granted under this Act are heritable and assignable and only registration of a plant variety confers the right. Essentially Derived Varieties (EDV) can also be registered under this Act and it may be new or extant.  Farmers are entitled to save, use, sow, re-sow, exchange or sell their farm produce including seed of a registered variety in an unbranded manner. Farmers' varieties are eligible for registration and farmers are totally exempted from payment of any fee in any proceedings under this Act.  The period of protection for field crops is 15 years and for trees and vines is 18 years and for notified varieties it is 15 years from the date of notification under section 5 of Seeds Act, 1966. Annual fee has to be paid every year for maintaining the registration and renewal fee has to be paid for the extended period of registration. Farmers can claim for compensation if the registered variety fails to provide expected performance under given conditions.  The rights granted under this Act are exclusive right to produce, sell, market, distribute, import and export the variety.  Civil and criminal remedies are provided for enforcement of breeders' rights and provisions relating to benefit sharing and compulsory licence in case registered variety is not made available to the public at reasonable price are provided. Compensation is also provided for village or rural communities if any registered variety has been developed using any variety in whose evolution such village or local community has contributed significantly.  The procedural details and modes of implementing this Act are provided in PPV&FR Rules, 2003.

Definition 
According to sec 2(c), "breeder" means a person or group of persons or a farmer or group of farmers or any institution which has "bred, evolved or developed any variety."

According to sec 2(k), "farmers" means any person who –
 "Cultivates crops by cultivating the land himself; or"
 "Cultivates crops by directly supervising the cultivation or land through any other person; or conserves and preserves, severally or jointly, with any other person any wild species or traditional varieties"; or
 "Adds value to such wild species or traditional varieties through selection and identification of their useful properties."

Genetic resources of economic plants and their wild relatives particularly in areas identified as agro-biodiversity hotspots are awarded annually from Gene Fund.  The name of the award is Plant Genome Saviour Community Award and the amount is INR 10,00,000 for each community.  A maximum of five awards are conferred in a year.

The Protection of Plant Varieties and Farmers' Rights Authority also confers Plant Genome Savior "Farmer Reward" and "Farmer Recognition" to the farmers engaged in the conservation of genetic resources of landraces and wild relatives of economic plants and their improvement through selection and preservation and the material so selected and preserved has been used as donors of gene in varieties registerable under the PPV&FR Act, 2001 (53 of 2001). Up )to 10 rewards and 20 recognitions (consisting of a citation, memento and cash prize) are conferred in a year.

See also
 International Union for the Protection of New Varieties of Plants
 Biological Diversity Act, 2002

References

External links
Protection of Plant Varieties and Farmers' Rights Authority
Plant Genome Saviour Community Award at Protection of Plant Varieties and Farmers’ Rights Authority, India

2001 in the environment
Agriculture legislation
Environmental law in India
Agriculture in India
Vajpayee administration
Acts of the Parliament of India 2001
Plant breeding
Biological patent law
Indian intellectual property law